Rakity is the name of several rural localities in Russia:
Rakity, Mikhaylovsky District, Altai Krai, a village in Mikhaylovsky District
Rakity, Rubtsovsky District, Altai Krai, a village in Rubtsovsky District